Bharadwaj Puram is a neighborhood of Prayagraj in Uttar Pradesh, India. It is sandwiched between Tagore Town and Daraganj, close to the bank of the River Ganga. Nearby are George Town, Allahabad University, Katra, and Civil Lines, as well as tourist attractions such as Alfred Park, Sangam, Anand Bhavan, and numerous temples. This neighborhood also has many commercial centers, schools, hospitals, ashrams, and parks. Bharadwaj Puram's main market is located on Matiyara Road and is a popular shopping destination. Alopi Bagh is in the south of the neighbourhood.

The neighbourhood is part of the Phulpur Lok Sabha and Prayagraj-North constituencies of Uttar Pradesh's legislative assembly.

Neighbourhoods in Allahabad